Cela is a município (municipality) in the province of Cuanza Sul (Kwanza Sul) in Angola.

Cela is bordered to the north by the municipality of Quibala, to the east by the municipality of Andulo, to the south by the municipalities of Bailundo and Cassongue, and to the west by the municipalities of Seles and Ebo.

The municipality contains the comunas (communes) of Waku Kungo, Kissanga Kungo and Sanga. The municipal seat is Waku Kungo.

References

Municipalities of Angola
Populated places in Cuanza Sul Province